

Juminda Lighthouse is a lighthouse at the northern tip of the Juminda Peninsula, Kuusalu Parish, in the region of Harju, Estonia. It is located in the Lahemaa National Park.

The lighthouse was built in 1937. It is a circular concrete tower with a lantern and double gallery. The upper portion of the lighthouse is painted red, the lower is painted white. Prior to 2006, the lighthouse had a height of 24 metres, the red portion at the top was added in 2006. The lighthouse has a glare configuration of: 3 s on, 2 s off, 3 s on, and 7 s off.

See also 

 List of lighthouses in Estonia

References

External links 

 

Lighthouses completed in 1937
Resort architecture in Estonia
Lighthouses in Estonia
Kuusalu Parish
Buildings and structures in Harju County